Evan Neufeldt (born June 16, 1987) is a Canadian skeleton racer. In 2014–15, he finished 22nd in the overall ranking. He competed for the top of the World Cup overall ranking. He then finished 23rd at the 2015 FIBT World Championships.

Career
Neufeldt was involved in many sports from a young age, notably in track and field, and was a pinch runner and fielder on fastball teams, a running back in high school football at Rosthern Junior College (2003, 2004), and a striker on competitive ultimate frisbee teams (Tommy Douglas Dream Machine -U of S Men's 2007-2009). While in university, he competed in track and field and pentathlon for U of S from 2008-2010 and came out with two bronze medals from Canada West Championships in Pentathlon and 4 × 200 m relay 2010. In 2009 he was sixth at Canada Summer Games in decathlon. He began skeleton in 2011 after a shoulder injury, and subsequent repair forced a break in his University education, and varsity sports career.

References

 Full career results

External links
 Official website
 

1987 births
Living people
Canadian male skeleton racers
Sportspeople from Saskatoon